Uden-Veghel is a polycentric metropolitan area, centred on the towns of Uden and Veghel, in the east of the province of North Brabant in the southern Netherlands. It consists of the neighbouring municipalities of Maashorst (merger of Uden and Landerd in 2022) and Meierijstad (merger of Schijndel, Sint-Oedenrode, and Veghel in 2017) with the surrounding municipalities of Bernheze and Boekel.

The province of North Brabant established the partnership in 2002 for spatial planning purposes, and stated that the municipalities of Uden and Veghel are complementary to each other. The agreement included zoning plans for the development of residential, business and industrial areas, as well as plans for the development and preservation of nature in the region.

The provincie of North Brabant defines the chain of Schijndel-Eerde-Veghel and Uden-Volkel as highly urbanized. The municipalities of Sint-Oedenrode and Landerd are described as being moderately urbanized, and Erp, Boekel and Bernheze are considered to be rural.

(source: CBS, Gemeente op Maat)

Notes

References

Metropolitan areas of the Netherlands
Regions of the Netherlands
Regions of North Brabant
Geography of Maashorst
Bernheze
Boekel
Meierijstad